The men's 1000 metres speed skating competition of the 2014 Sochi Olympics was held at Adler Arena Skating Center on 12 February 2014. Stefan Groothuis won the gold medal.

Qualification
A total of forty speed skaters could qualify for this distance, with a maximum of four skaters per country. The top 20 of the men's 1000 metres World Cup standings after World Cup 4 in Berlin secured a spot for their country. Then the additional 20 spots were awarded based on a time ranking of all times skated in the World Cup and the 2014 World Sprint Speed Skating Championships. A reserve list was also made.

Records
Prior to this competition, the existing world and Olympic records were as follows.

At the 2013 World Single Distance Speed Skating Championships the track record was set by Denis Kuzin at 1:09.14.

The following records were set during this competition.

TR = track record

Results
The race started at 18:00.

TR = track record

References

Men's speed skating at the 2014 Winter Olympics